Aeon is the second studio album by the Norwegian black metal band Zyklon. It was released in 2003 through Candlelight Records.

Track listing 
Music by Zyklon (except track 5, written by Zyklon & Cosmocrator); lyrics By Bård "Faust" Eithun.

Personnel

Zyklon 
 Secthdamon – vocals, bass guitar, synth arrangements, programming
 Destructhor – lead guitar, synth arrangements, programming
 Samoth – rhythm guitar, synth arrangements, programming
 Trym Torson – drums, synth arrangements, programming

Additional musicians 
Thorbjørn Akkerhaugen: Synth Arrangements & Programming
Matt Jarman/Dissident Sound Industries – outro arrangement & programming on "Electric Current"
Daemon – backing and additional vocals on "Two Thousand Years", "The Prophetic Method" and "Electric Current"
Ofu Kahn – lead vocals on "An Eclectic Manner"
Lrz – additional drones and programming on "An Eclectic Manner"

Production 
Produced by Thorbjørn Akkerhaugen, Fredrik Nordström and Zyklon
Recorded, engineered and mixed by Fredrik Nordstrom
Mastered by Tom Kvålsvoll and Samoth
Designed by Stephen O'Malley in co-operation with Samoth

References 

Zyklon albums
2003 albums
Albums produced by Fredrik Nordström